The 2021 UC Irvine Anteaters baseball team represented the University of California, Irvine during the 2021 NCAA Division I baseball season. The Anteaters played their home games at Anteater Ballpark as a member of the Big West Conference. They were led by third-year head coach Ben Orloff.

Previous season
The 2020 UC Irvine Anteaters baseball team notched a 8–7 (0–0) regular-season record. The season prematurely ended on March 12, 2020, due to concerns over the COVID-19 pandemic.

Schedule and results

Stanford Regional

2021 MLB draft

References 

2021 Big West Conference baseball season
2021
2021 in sports in California
Uc Irvine
2021